Burbank is a greenbelt suburb in the City of Brisbane, Queensland, Australia.

Geography

Burbank is an outer suburb of City of Brisbane and borders City of Redland to the east and City of Logan to the south.

Burbank has a number of small intermittent creeks winding between cleared and uncleared rolling hills.

The main road across in the area is the Mount Gravatt-Capalaba Road. There are also a couple of working and hobby farms.  There are a few palm nurseries and at least two turf farms in the area. Burbank has a number of churches and temples and there is a Jewish school. The closest public primary school is Mackenzie State School (formerly Mount Petrie State School) in Mackenzie. There are no shops in the suburb and public transport is very limited.

The almost entirely residential outer suburb is dominated by large acreage blocks, many with extensive gardens and prestige housing built on them.  A dam built in the late 1960s has shaped the modern development of this area. Called the Leslie Harrison Dam, it forms the Tingalpa Reservoir on Tingalpa Creek. The dam once provided water for residents of Redland City but has been connected to the regional water supply network.  Because of water quality concerns, the population density has been kept low within the immediate catchment area.

History
The area was originally known as Upper Tingalpa. The suburb was named after Alfred Harry Burbank, a surveyor and farmer, who was a resident in the area from 1890 to 1908. Burbank carried out surveys across Queensland over his 65 year career. Frank Burbank, a local horse breeder and timber-getter, was his son.  Frank stayed in the area until his death in the 1950s.  Burbank was officially named on 1 June 1976.

Sinai College opened on 29 January 1990.

Since the inception of the Bushland Preservation Levy in 1990, the Brisbane City Council has purchased undeveloped properties in Burbank for nature reserves. A koala habitation protection called Brisbane Koala Bushlands was also created, with visitor facilities and boardwalks located on Ford Road. A second park, called JC Trotter Memorial Park, is located on Cherbon Street, adjacent to the Tingalpa Reservoir. It is estimated that 3,000 to 5,000 koalas live in the southeast of Brisbane and this park is designed to protect their habitats and their movement corridors.

In 2008, a private property at Burbank became the first property to be classified as conservation area under an environmental covenant with the Brisbane City Council. The agreement is part of the BCC's GreenHeart CitySmart plan which aims to restore 40% of the city's land to natural habitat by 2026.

Burbank has not been subdivided into small residential blocks of land to ensure the population remains low.  In figures published in early 2009 from the Australian Property Investor magazine, Burbank had the third highest median house price in Australia, at A$1.1 million. Recent census data shows that Burbank has the most three-car households in Brisbane, at a rate of 40%. According to RP Data figures, residents of Burbank remain living in the suburb for an average of 13 years, which is the fourth longest in Brisbane, behind nearby Sheldon and both Point Lookout and Amity Point on North Stradbroke Island.

Education
Sinai College is a private primary (Prep-6) school for boys and girls at 20 Moxon Road. In 2018, the school had an enrolment of 30 students with 5 teachers (4 full-time equivalent) and 3 non-teaching staff (2 full-time equivalent).

There are no government schools in Burbank. The nearest government primary schools are Gumdale State School in Gumdale to the north-west, Mackenzie State Primary School (previously Mount Petrie State School) in neighbouring Mackenzie to the west Capalaba State College in neighbouring Capalaba to the north-east, Rochedale State School in neighbouring Rochedale to the west, and Rochedale South State School in neighbouring Rochedale South to the south-west. The nearest government secondary schools are Mansfield State High School in Mansfield to the north-west, Rochedale State High School in neighbouring Rochedale to the west, and Capalaba State College in neighbouring Capalaba to the north-east.

Amenities 
There are a number of parks in the area:

 Alperton Road Park
 Ford Road Park

 J.C. Trotter Memorial Park

 Leacroft Road Park

 Longton Court Park (no.100)

 Mt Petrie Recreation Reserve

 Prout Road (485) Park

 Prout Road Park

 Suzette Street Park

 Upfield Street Park

See also

List of Brisbane suburbs

References

External links

 

Suburbs of the City of Brisbane